I Love You Rosa is a 1972 Israeli film directed by Moshé Mizrahi. It was nominated for the Academy Award for Best Foreign Language Film. It was also entered into the 1972 Cannes Film Festival.

Plot

Based on the life of director Mizrachi's mother in late 19th century Jerusalem, the flashback-framed plot involves a young, childless, Sephardic-Mizrahi widow under pressure to comply with ancient law and eventually marry her late husband's little brother, Nissim, a grief-stricken eleven-year-old at odds with his other brother and sister-in-law, in whose home he lives. Much against her inclination for independence, the widowed Rosa takes him in with the rabbi's permission, earning a living for them both, and seeing to his education and beginnings of a gainful occupation for him. As he grows into an adolescent with changing affections toward her, and other suitors remain open to her, conflicts flare. And Nissim disappears. Five years later, when he returns as a young man, it is from Europe, with an education and livelihood of his own, confronting Rosa's determination to possess her own freedom, and the long-postponed legal decision between them.

Jerusalem had a brief but heavy snowfall during the shoot; the filmmakers incorporated it beautifully into the script rather than work around it.

Cast
In alphabetical order
 Zivi Avramson - Esther
 Naomi Bachar - Luna
 Michal Bat-Adam - Rosa
 Yehuda Efroni - Don Yitzhak
 Levana Finkelstein - Jamila
 Esther Grotes - Alegra
 Gunther Hirschberg - narrator
 Avner Hizkiyahu - Rabbi
 Elisheva Michaeli - Regina
 Gabi Otterman - young Nissim
 Aliza Rosen - Rabbi's wife
 Yosef Shiloach - Eli
 Moshe Tal - adult Nissim
 Sharit Yishai - Fortuna

See also
 List of submissions to the 45th Academy Awards for Best Foreign Language Film
 List of Israeli submissions for the Academy Award for Best Foreign Language Film

References

External links

1972 films
Israeli drama films
1970s Hebrew-language films
Films directed by Moshé Mizrahi
1972 drama films
Films set in Jerusalem
Golan-Globus films
Films produced by Menahem Golan